Events during the year 1992 in Northern Ireland.

Incumbents
 Secretary of State - Peter Brooke (until 10 April), Patrick Mayhew (from 10 April)

Events
20 January - Peter Brooke offers to resign as Secretary of State for Northern Ireland following criticism of his singing on The Late Late Show only hours after a Provisional Irish Republican Army bomb explodes.
4 February
Mary Robinson becomes the first President of Ireland to visit Belfast.
An off-duty Royal Ulster Constabulary officer in Belfast kills three people in a Sinn Féin office before committing suicide.
5 February - Ulster loyalist gunmen kill five Catholics in an attack on a bookmaker's shop in Belfast.
9 April - United Kingdom general election. The UK Conservative Party stands candidates in the province for the first time since the Ulster Unionist Party broke with them in 1972 but does not win any seats.
1 July - The Ulster Defence Regiment is amalgamated with the Royal Irish Rangers to form the Royal Irish Regiment of the British Army.
10 August - The Ulster Defence Association is proscribed by the Government of the United Kingdom.
23 September - The IRA destroys Belfast's forensic science laboratory with a huge bomb.

Arts and literature
 Alternative rock band Ash is formed in Downpatrick.
 The Hole in the Wall Gang win a UK Sony Award for Best Radio Comedy for their first radio series A Perforated Ulster.
 David Park's novel The Healing is published.
 Glenn Patterson's novel Fat Lad is published.
 Martin Waddell's children's book Can't You Sleep, Little Bear?, the first in his Big Bear, Little Bear series, is published.

Sport

Football
Irish League
Winners: Glentoran

Irish Cup
Winners: Glenavon 2 - 1 Linfield

GAA
 Donegal defeat Derry 0-14 to 1-09 to win the Ulster Senior Football Championship.
 Donegal subsequently defeat Dublin 0-18 to 0-14 to win the All-Ireland Senior Football Championship for the first time.

Golf
New Strand course at Portstewart Golf Club, designed by Des Giffin, opened for play. The Irish Amateur Close Championship was played there.

Births
 1 January - Shane Duffy, footballer.
 30 May - Thomas McBride, footballer.
 1 June - Dean Jarvis, footballer.
 4 July - Jamie Douglas, footballer.
 12 July - Eoghan Quigg, pop singer 
 9 September – Damian McGinty, actor and singer 
 17 September - William Buller, driver.

Deaths
20 March - Michael McLaverty, novelist (born 1904).
16 April - Stanley McMaster, barrister and Unionist Member of Parliament from 1959 to 1974 (born 1926).
13 May - F. E. McWilliam, sculptor (born 1909).
25 November - Pearse Jordan, Provisional Irish Republican Army volunteer killed by RUC (born 1969).

See also
1992 in England
1992 in Scotland
1992 in Wales

References

 
Northern Ireland